Trichoblemma is a genus of moths of the family Erebidae. The genus was erected by George Hampson in 1926.

Species
Trichoblemma badia (Swinhoe, 1903) Peninsular Malaysia, Sumatra, Borneo
Trichoblemma lophophora (Hampson, 1895) Myanmar
Trichoblemma major Roepke, 1938 Sulawesi

References

Calpinae